Santiago Mostajo Trigo (April 1912 – 29 March 1997) was a Spanish former professional cyclist. He was professional between 1932 and 1936.

Biography
Santiago was born in Calatayud, Aragon on April 1912 and died in Barcelona at the age of 84. His son Santiago Mostajo Gutiérrez was also a professional cyclist. From 1935,  he raced alongside Orbea team. As a climbing specialist, Santiago achieved his highest position in the 1932 Tour when he was twenty. He had, however, already established himself as a contender for honours in other Tours. He was twentythree and a stage winner in the 1935. At the end of this season, he retired from cycling. He competed in the team Orbea event at the 1935.

Major results
1941
National Championship Cyclocross

References

External links
 

 
1912 births
1997 deaths
People from Calatayud
Sportspeople from the Province of Zaragoza
Spanish male cyclists
Cyclists from Aragon